The 2012 African Sevens was an international rugby sevens competition organized by the Confederation of African Rugby. It was the fourth edition of the African Sevens, which had been held every four years since the year 2000, and served as the African continental qualifier for the 2013 Rugby World Cup Sevens. The tournament, hosted together with 2012 African Women's Sevens, was held in Rabat on September 29–30, 2012.

General 
The tournament was played at Stade Bourgogne in the Moroccan city of Rabat. The event was attended by eight rugby sevens nations. On the first day they were playing in two groups of four. The second day there were places at stake was not only the medals of the event, but also two places in the finals of 2013 World Cup.

The teams from South Africa and Kenya, who had already qualified for the World Cup, did not compete. In their absence, Zimbabwe won the competition, defeating Tunisia in the final. The two finalists gained promotion to the World Cup in 2013.

Group stage

Group A

Group B

Knockout phase

Bowl

Cup

Outright

References

External links 
 CAR

2012
2012 rugby sevens competitions
2012 in African rugby union
rugby union
International rugby union competitions hosted by Morocco